John Earl Henderson (January 4, 1917 – December 3, 1994) was an American politician of the Republican Party who served in the United States House of Representatives from 1955 to 1961.

Biography 
Henderson was born on January 4, 1917, at Crafton, Pennsylvania. He moved to Cambridge, Ohio, in 1920, and moved to a dairy farm in nearby Guernsey County in 1922. He attended the schools of Guernsey County, and high school at Cambridge. He graduated from the Ohio Wesleyan University at Delaware, Ohio, in 1939 and from the University of Michigan Law School at Ann Arbor, Michigan, in 1942. He joined the United States Army as a private in 1942, and rose to captain of infantry after service in Europe. He was discharged in 1946 and commenced practice in Cambridge.

Henderson was elected to the Ohio House of Representatives from 1951 to 1954, and elected as a Republican to the 84th through 86th Congresses, (January 3, 1955 – January 3, 1961). Henderson voted in favor of the Civil Rights Acts of 1957 and 1960. He was not a candidate for re-nomination in 1960, and resumed law practice in Cambridge. He was a judge of the Guernsey County Court of Common Pleas 1980–1986, and resided in Cambridge until his death on December 3, 1994.

References

Links
 

 

1917 births
1994 deaths
Ohio Wesleyan University alumni
Republican Party members of the Ohio House of Representatives
Ohio state court judges
Ohio lawyers
United States Army officers
United States Army personnel of World War II
People from Cambridge, Ohio
University of Michigan Law School alumni
20th-century American lawyers
20th-century American politicians
20th-century American judges
Republican Party members of the United States House of Representatives from Ohio